Oil and Natural Gas Corporation Football Club is an Indian I-League football club based in Mumbai, Maharashtra. The club is affiliated with the Oil and Natural Gas Corporation which runs the club. This means that ONGC Football Club is an institutional club.

Key

 P = Played
 W = Games won
 D = Games drawn
 L = Games lost
 F = Goals for
 A = Goals against
 Pts = Points
 Pos = Final position

 IL = I-League
 IL 2 = I-League 2nd Division

 Group = Group stage

Seasons

References

ONGC FC
ONGC F.C.
ONGC F.C.